The 1976–77 Northern Rugby Football League season was the 82nd season of rugby league football. Sixteen English clubs competed for the Championship, with Featherstone Rovers claiming the title.

Season summary
The League Champions were Featherstone Rovers for the first and, to date, only time. During the season, the Salford versus Leeds match was abandoned after 38 minutes when Chris Sanderson of Leeds suffered a fatal injury. Leeds were ahead 5-2, but the game was declared null and void and not replayed.

Rochdale Hornets, Leigh, Barrow and Oldham were demoted to the Second Division.

The Challenge Cup Winners were Leeds who beat Widnes 16-7 in the final.

Players No.6 Trophy Winners were Castleford who beat Blackpool Borough 25-15.

Rugby League Premiership Trophy Winners were St. Helens who beat Warrington 32-20.

BBC2 Floodlit Trophy Winners were Castleford who beat Leigh 12-4 in the final.

2nd Division Champions were Hull FC, and they, Dewsbury, Bramley and New Hunslet were promoted to the First Division.

Widnes beat Workington Town (from Cumbria) 16–11 to win the Lancashire County Cup, and Leeds beat Featherstone Rovers 16–12 to win the Yorkshire County Cup.

League Tables

First Division Championship

Second Division Championship

Challenge Cup

Leeds beat Widnes 16-7 in the final played at Wembley Stadium on Saturday 7 May 1977 in front of a crowd of 80,871. The winner of the Lance Todd Trophy was the Leeds prop, Steve Pitchford.

This was Leeds’ tenth Cup Final win in fourteen Final appearances.

Leeds 16 
Bryan Murrell
Alan Smith
Neil Hague
Les Dyl (1 try)
John Atkinson (1 try)
John Holmes
Kevin Dick (1 try, 3 goals, 1 drop goal)
Mick Harrison
David Ward
Steve Pitchford
Graham Eccles
Phil Cookson
Stanley Fearnley
Roy Dickinson on for Stanley Fearnley
David Smith on for Alan Smith

Widnes 7
Ray Dutton (2 goals)
Stuart Wright
Mal Aspey (1 try)
David Eckersley
Dennis O'Neill
Eric Hughes
Reg Bowden
Bill Ramsey
Keith Elwell
Jim Mills
Alan Dearden
Mick Adams
Doug Laughton
Derek 'Mick' George on for Stuart Wright
John Foran on for Alan Dearden

Referee: Vince Moss (Manchester)

League Cup

Premiership

Sources
 1976-77 Rugby Football League season at wigan.rlfans.com
 The Challenge Cup at The Rugby Football League website

References

1976 in English rugby league
1977 in English rugby league
Northern Rugby Football League seasons